"Como Así"  (English: "How So?" or "What Do You Mean?") is a song by Argentine singer Lali featuring boyband CNCO, released as the second single from her fourth studio album, Libra (2020). Written by Lali, Brasa, Yoel Henriquez, Pablo Preciado, along with its producers Jowan Espinosa and Rolo, the song was released on November 8, 2019 through Sony Music Argentina.

The song was voted Best Latin Collaboration of 2019 by Billboard readers.

Background and composition
The collaboration was born after Lali and CNCO co-hosted the 2019 Premios Juventud. Lyrically, "Como Así" was described as "a heartfelt track about a couple who, despite calling it quits, can't fathom the fact that they have broken up and are unable to move on". The song kicks off with romantic guitar riffs before dropping a catchy pop-dembow melody.

Accolades

Music video
Filmed in Mexico City and directed by Joaquín Cambre, the music video made its debut the same night "Como Así" was released. In the clip, Lali portrays the love interest for each of the CNCO members, with each scene telling a different story.

Charts

Weekly charts

Year-end charts

See also
 List of airplay number-one hits in Argentina

References

2019 songs
2019 singles
Spanish-language songs
Lali Espósito songs
CNCO songs
Sony Music singles
Songs written by Lali Espósito
Songs written by Yoel Henriquez
Songs written by Pablo Preciado